Lacrosse in Israel is a minor sport, with 700 players as of June 2015.

Israel Lacrosse Association

The Israel Lacrosse Association (ILA) is the official governing body of lacrosse in Israel, and is a member of World Lacrosse and the European Lacrosse Federation. It was founded to develop and promote lacrosse within Israel and strives to offer lacrosse to Israelis of all ages.
Israel Lacrosse was founded in 2010 by Scott Neiss who previously served as an executive for the National Lacrosse League, along with William Beroza and Howard Borkan. It was officially recognized by World Lacrosse in April 2011. Israel Lacrosse COO David Lasday directs grassroots youth lacrosse expansion utilizing the status and influence of National Team players to develop the sport throughout Israel

Israel Premier Lacrosse League

The Israel Premier Lacrosse League (IPLL) is the premier lacrosse league in Israel, which debuted in 2015. The league competes during summer months only, in an attempt to attract players from abroad to participate.

Teams

Fields
There are six stadiums used by the IPLL which are:

2015 season
The 2015 season was the inaugural season of the IPLL. Barak Netanya LC won the IPLL Championship with a win over Haifa LC, with Bryan Hopper winning the EL AL Player of the Game award. A total of 16 games were played, with each team playing eight games.

Source:

2016 season
The 2016 season of the IPLL was their second season. Tel Aviv LC decided to suspend operations for the 2016 season, however Ashdod LC, Kiryat Gat LC, and Be'er Sheva LC joined the league for the 2016 season. A total of 22 games were played, with each team playing either seven or eight games.

Source:

2018 season

Source:

International competition
Israel fields men's, indoor, and women's national teams, which compete at both European and World levels.

European Lacrosse Championships

In 2016, Israel's men's team won the Silver Medal, placing second in a field of 24, England won the gold 7-6 in regulation play. This was Israel's first medal in international play.

World Lacrosse Championships

In its first-ever appearance, for the Men's 2014 World Lacrosse Championship in Denver, Israel finished in 7th place out of 38 nations.
Four years later, with the 2018 World Lacrosse Championship held in Netanya, Israel, Israel again finished in 7th place, this time out of 46 nations.

Women's European Lacrosse Championships

Women's Lacrosse World Cup

Shabbat policy
The ILA has a consistent position of not playing or scheduling games during Shabbat. Israel Lacrosse released a statement saying: “As a new sport to Israel it is imperative . . . we cannot ignore that reasonably large percentage of our nations’ people, our teams’ players and our associations’ members would be offended if we took the field on Shabbat."  The organization has stated that the policy is a national identity issue, not a religious issue.

References

 
Israel
Israel
2010 establishments in Israel